Sy Weintraub (May 28, 1923 – April 4, 2000) was a film and television producer best known for his series of Tarzan films and television episodes between 1959 and 1968.  Weintraub broke with the Johnny Weissmuller formula of portraying Tarzan as a pidgin-speaking noble savage who lives in a treehouse with Jane and Boy. Instead, his Tarzan was an educated depressed loner, much closer to Edgar Rice Burroughs's original conception of the character and Boy is replaced by a young orphan named Jai. Weintraub also produced two Sherlock Holmes films for television and was an owner of Panavision.

Career

After World War II service in the US Army, he formed Flamingo Films with David L. Wolper, who acquired the television rights to Eagle-Lion Films in 1951. Starting in 1958, Weintraub took over the Tarzan franchise from Sol Lesser and began producing Tarzan films made on actual locations (most previous Tarzan films had been shot on studio sets, with stock jungle footage edited in). He decided to drop the character of Jane and portray Tarzan as a well-spoken lone adventurer, though the title character is allies with Jai and the chimpanzee Cheeta. Weintraub started with Tarzan's Greatest Adventure (1959) and its follow-up, Tarzan the Magnificent (1960), both with Gordon Scott.  Weintraub then produced Tarzan Goes to India and Tarzan's Three Challenges (filmed in Thailand), both with Jock Mahoney. In 1965 Weintraub filmed three Tarzan films back to back with former Los Angeles Rams football star Mike Henry: Tarzan and the Valley of Gold (Mexico), Tarzan and the Great River and Tarzan and the Jungle Boy both filmed in Brazil.  When Henry was tired of his grueling Tarzan work and refused to do the television series, Weintraub hired Ron Ely for the role.

In 1965 Weintraub bought Panavision but sold it later. National General Corporation acquired Weintraub's Banner Productions in 1967 and Weintraub became an officer, director and shareholder of NGC. In March 1969, he was retained on an consultancy basis for 5 years, receiving a percentage of the gross from Tarzan properties. He was briefly, in 1967, the president of the CBS Television Network. Weintraub claimed to have discovered several starlets, including actress Goldie Hawn.

In 1982 Weintraub planned to co-produce six Sherlock Holmes films for television but only two, The Sign of Four and The Hound of the Baskervilles, both with Ian Richardson, were produced in 1983. When Weintraub discovered that Granada Television had acquired the rights for their own series with Jeremy Brett, he was awarded damages in an out-of-court settlement.

In 1997, he unsuccessfully sued artist Hiro Yamagata, alleging the latter had reneged on a contract to produce art for Weintraub.  After a trial in Santa Monica Superior Court, however, the jury sided with Yamagata.  In that legal action, he was represented by attorney David Ganezer.

In retirement, he speculated in the silver market, owned race horses and built one of the world's largest collections of ancient coins.

Sy Weintraub died of pancreatic cancer in 2000. He had two daughters - Lori Weintraub, an attorney in Century City, and Cynthia Weintraub, a professor at Harvard University - and four grandchildren.

References

External links
 

American film producers
American numismatists
1923 births
2000 deaths
20th-century American businesspeople
United States Army personnel of World War II